Neuropsychological tests are specifically designed tasks that are used to measure a psychological function known to be linked to a particular brain structure or pathway. Tests are used for research into brain function and in a clinical setting for the diagnosis of deficits. They usually involve the systematic administration of clearly defined procedures in a formal environment. Neuropsychological tests are typically administered to a single person working with an examiner in a quiet office environment, free from distractions. As such, it can be argued that neuropsychological tests at times offer an estimate of a person's peak level of cognitive performance. Neuropsychological tests are a core component of the process of conducting neuropsychological assessment, along with personal, interpersonal and contextual factors.

Most neuropsychological tests in current use are based on traditional psychometric theory. In this model, a person's raw score on a test is compared to a large general population normative sample, that should ideally be drawn from a comparable population to the person being examined. Normative studies frequently provide data stratified by age, level of education, and/or ethnicity, where such factors have been shown by research to affect performance on a particular test. This allows for a person's performance to be compared to a suitable control group, and thus provide a fair assessment of their current cognitive function.

According to Larry J. Seidman, the analysis of the wide range of neuropsychological tests can be broken down into four categories. First is an analysis of overall performance, or how well people do from test to test along with how they perform in comparison to the average score. Second is left-right comparisons: how well a person performs on specific tasks that deal with the left and right side of the body. Third is pathognomic signs, or specific test results that directly relate to a distinct disorder. Finally, the last category is differential patterns, which are typically used to diagnose specific diseases or types of damage.

Categories
Most forms of cognition actually involve multiple cognitive functions working in unison, however tests can be organised into broad categories based on the cognitive function which they predominantly assess. Some tests appear under multiple headings as different versions and aspects of tests can be used to assess different functions.

Intelligence
Intelligence testing in a research context is relatively more straightforward than in a clinical context. In research, intelligence is tested and results are generally as obtained, however in a clinical setting intelligence may be impaired so estimates are required for comparison with obtained results. Premorbid estimates can be determined through a number of methods, the most common include:
comparison of test results to expected achievement levels based on prior education and occupation and the use of hold tests which are based on cognitive faculties which are generally good indicators of intelligence and thought to be more resistant to cognitive damage, e.g. language.

 National Adult Reading Test (NART) 
 Wechsler Adult Intelligence Scale (WAIS)
 Wechsler Intelligence Scale for Children (WISC)
 Wechsler Preschool and Primary Scale of Intelligence (WPPSI)
 Wechsler Test of Adult Reading (WTAR)

Memory
Memory is a very broad function which includes several distinct abilities, all of which can be selectively impaired and require individual testing. There is disagreement as to the number of memory systems, depending on the psychological perspective taken. From a clinical perspective, a view of five distinct types of memory, is in most cases sufficient. Semantic memory and episodic memory (collectively called declarative memory or explicit memory); procedural memory and priming or perceptual learning (collectively called non-declarative memory or implicit memory) all four of which are long term memory systems; and working memory or short term memory. Semantic memory is memory for facts, episodic memory is autobiographical memory, procedural memory is memory for the performance of skills, priming is memory facilitated by prior exposure to a stimulus and working memory is a form of short term memory for information manipulation.}

 Benton Visual Retention Test
 California Verbal Learning Test
 Cambridge Prospective Memory Test (CAMPROMPT)
 Gollin figure test
 Memory Assessment Scales (MAS)
 Rey Auditory Verbal Learning Test
 Rivermead Behavioural Memory Test
 Test of Memory and Learning (TOMAL)
 Mental Attributes Profiling System
 Wechsler Memory Scale (WMS)

Language
Language functions include speech, reading and writing, all of which can be selectively impaired.}

 Boston Diagnostic Aphasia Examination
 Boston Naming Test
 Comprehensive Aphasia Test (CAT)
 Multilingual Aphasia Examination

Executive function
Executive functions is an umbrella term for a various cognitive processes and sub-processes. The executive functions include: problem solving, planning, organizational skills, selective attention, inhibitory control and some aspects of short term memory.}

 Behavioural Assessment of Dysexecutive Syndrome (BADS)
 CNS Vital Signs (Brief Core Battery)
 Continuous performance task (CPT)
 Controlled Oral Word Association Test (COWAT)
 d2 Test of Attention
 Delis–Kaplan Executive Function System (D-KEFS)
 Digit Vigilance Test
 Figural Fluency Test
 Halstead Category Test
 Hayling and Brixton tests
 Kaplan Baycrest Neurocognitive Assessment (KBNA)
 Kaufman Short Neuropsychological Assessment
 Paced Auditory Serial Addition Test (PASAT)
 Rey–Osterrieth Complex Figure
 Ruff Figural Fluency Test
 Stroop task
 Test of Variables of Attention (T.O.V.A.)
 Tower of London Test
 Trail-Making Test (TMT) or Trails A & B
 Wisconsin Card Sorting Test (WCST) 
 Symbol Digit Modalities Test
 Test of Everyday Attention (TEA)

Visuospatial
Neuropsychological tests of visuospatial function should cover the areas of visual perception, visual construction and visual integration. Though not their only functions, these tasks are to a large degree carried out by areas of the parietal lobe.

 Clock Test
 Hooper Visual Organisation Task (VOT)
 Rey–Osterrieth Complex Figure

Dementia specific
Dementia testing is often done by way of testing the cognitive functions that are most often impaired by the disease e.g. memory, orientation, language and problem solving. Tests such as these are by no means conclusive of deficits, but may give a good indication as to the presence or severity of dementia.}

 The Alzheimer's Disease Assessment Scale-Cognitive Subscale (ADAS-Cog)
 Clinical Dementia Rating
 Dementia Rating Scale

Batteries assessing multiple neuropsychological functions
There are some test batteries which combine a range of tests to provide an overview of cognitive skills. These are usually good early tests to rule out problems in certain functions and provide an indication of functions which may need to be tested more specifically.}

 Barcelona Neuropsychological Test (BNT)
 Cambridge Neuropsychological Test Automated Battery (CANTAB)
 Cognistat (The Neurobehavioral Cognitive Status Examination)
 Cognitive Assessment Screening Instrument (CASI)
 Cognitive Function Scanner (CFS)
 Dean–Woodcock Neuropsychological Assessment System (DWNAS)
 General Practitioner Assessment Of Cognition (GPCOG)
 Hooper Visual Organization Test
 Luria–Nebraska Neuropsychological Battery
 MicroCog
 Mini mental state examination (MMSE)
 NEPSY
 Repeatable Battery for the Assessment of Neuropsychological Status
 Short Parallel Assessments of Neuropsychological Status (SPANS)
 CDR Computerized Assessment System

Automated computerized cognitive tests
Traditional cognitive examinations are mostly paper and pen based. As such most of them are time consuming and require special training to be carried out. Today there is a rapidly growing number of automated computerized cognitive tests emerging, for example Brain on Track, Cogstate, CAMCI, CANTAB. Several of these new tests are shoving promising ability to discriminate between healthy individuals and different cognitive difficulties and/or to monitor cognitive impairment over time. Since these tests are easily administered to large groups of people this is opening up possibilities to, for example, regularly screen portions of the population at risk for cognitive decline and early on give adequate support and treatment.

Benefits of Neuropsychological Testing 
The most beneficial factor of neuropsychological assessment is that it provides an accurate diagnosis of the disorder for the patient when it is unclear to the psychologist what exactly the patient has. This allows for accurate treatment later on in the process because treatment is driven by the exact symptoms of the disorder and how a specific patient may react to different treatments. The assessment allows the psychologist and patient to understand the severity of the deficit and to allow better decision-making by both parties. It is also helpful in understanding deteriorating diseases because the patient can be assessed multiple times to see how the disorder is progressing.

See also 

 
 
 
 
 
 
 
 , such as psychometrics

References

Further reading

External links